The Namaqua rock gecko or Namaqua flat gecko (Afroedura namaquensis) is a species of African geckos found in South Africa.

References

namaquensis
Reptiles described in 1938
Endemic reptiles of South Africa
Taxa named by Vivian Frederick Maynard FitzSimons
Fauna of South Africa
Endemic fauna of South Africa